Little Oberon, directed by Kevin Carlin, is an Australian telemovie starring Sigrid Thornton, which was broadcast on 18 September 2005 by Network Nine. The movie was filmed during 2004 in and around the town of Marysville, Victoria. The township was devastated in the February 2009 bush fires of Black Saturday. Also appearing in the telemovie were Brittany Byrnes, Tasma Walton and Peter Rowsthorn.

The film is about Georgie Green (Walton) and her daughter Natasha (Byrnes, nominated for an AFI award) going to visit Georgie's mother, Lola (Thornton) who is dying of cancer. Thornton shaved her head for the role; and said that wearing a bald cap would be disrespectful to cancer patients. Natasha tries to find out the identity of her father and begins to have visions of a young friend of her mother who had disappeared 16 years before. With Georgie – a witch (Wicca) – and family tensions high, there are settling-in problems when Georgie and Natasha decide to stay for a while.

Cast 
Sigrid Thornton – Lola Green
Tasma Walton – Georgie Green
Brittany Byrnes – Natasha Green
Alexander Cappelli – Gresham
Brett Climo – Dr. Vivian Cage
Helen Dallimore – Siobhan
Peter Rowsthorn – Miss Kafka
Morgan O'Neill – Dennis
Samatha Reynolds – Cathy Burke
Katrina Milosevic – Fatima

References

External links

Little Oberon at the National Film and Sound Archive

2005 television films
2005 films
Australian drama television films
2005 drama films
2000s English-language films
Films directed by Kevin Carlin